Daughter of the Regiment is a 1929 British-German silent film directed by Hans Behrendt and starring Betty Balfour, Alexander D'Arcy, and Kurt Gerron. The plot is loosely based on the 1840 opera composed by Gaetano Donizetti. Subsequent adaptations of the story were made in 1933 and 1953.

The film's sets were designed by Heinrich Richter.

Cast
 Betty Balfour as Marie, Regiments Daughter
 Alexander D'Arcy
 Kurt Gerron as Quippo, Guard
 Julius Falkenstein
 Olga Limburg as Countess Brascani

References

Bibliography

External links

1929 films
German historical films
British historical films
1920s historical films
Films of the Weimar Republic
German silent feature films
Films directed by Hans Behrendt
British silent feature films
Films based on operas
German black-and-white films
British black-and-white films
Gaetano Donizetti
1920s British films
1920s German films